The Whore is a Norwegian comedy-horror film directed by Reinert Kiil and starring Jørgen Langhelle.

Plot 
Rikke is an author and is writing on a new novel. To find inspiration she decides to get out to the countryside town where her mother is buried. This local community called Dokka is full of goons who make it difficult for Rikkie to write her book.

Cast

Production
Kiil shot the project with a budget of 240,000 Kroner in just 10 days with a shooting schedule of 16 hours per day at a cabin in Oslo. It is Norway's first Grindhouse film. Kiil cast Scandinavian porn star Isabel Vibe for the lead character Rikke.

Release
The film premiered on September 9, 2009, in Oslo and was on February 5, 2010, released on DVD in Norway. The Whore was banned in Minneapolis at the Minneapolis underground film festival; a private screening was later organised.

Awards
The film won Best Feature Award in the Netherlands at BUT FILM FESTIVAL 2009 and the award was presented to Reinert Kiil by director John Waters. The Whore won best sound mix at Denver Underground Film Festival in 2009.

Soundtrack
The score was composed by Apoptygma Berzerk sound engineer Vegard Blomberg.

Sequel
The Sequel Inside the Whore was released 2011 in Norway. It was filmed in summer 2010 in Kvamm, Norway. The sequel's director was Reinert Kiil, who also portrayed the lead character. Other cast members were Jørgen Langhelle, Viktoria Winge, Kim Sønderholm, porn star Isabel Vibe and Reality TV (Big Brother) star Anette Young.

References

External links
 
 

2009 films
2000s Norwegian-language films
2009 horror films
Anthology films
2009 comedy horror films
Films about writers
Norwegian comedy horror films
Rape and revenge films
2009 comedy films